The 1945 edition of the Campeonato Carioca kicked off on July 8, 1945 and ended on November 18, 1945. It was organized by FMF (Federação Metropolitana de Futebol, or Metropolitan Football Federation). Ten teams participated. Vasco da Gama won the title for the 6th time. no teams were relegated.

System
The tournament would be disputed in a double round-robin format, with the team with the most points winning the title.

Torneio Relâmpago

Top Scores

Torneio Municipal

Top Scores

Championship

Top Scores

References

Campeonato Carioca seasons
Carioca